The 2006–07 Grand Prix of Figure Skating Final was an elite figure skating competition event held at the Ice Palace in Saint Petersburg, Russia from December 14 through December 17, 2006. Medals were awarded in men's singles, ladies' singles, pair skating, and ice dancing.

The Grand Prix Final was the culminating event of the ISU Grand Prix of Figure Skating series, which consisted of 2006 Skate America, 2006 Skate Canada International, 2006 Trophée Eric Bompard, 2006 Cup of China, 2006 Cup of Russia, and 2006 NHK Trophy competitions. The top six skaters from each discipline competed in the final.

Format
The rules varied from the other Grand Prix events. The skaters performed the short program (or original dance, for ice dancers) in reverse order of their rankings, so the top scorer in the Grand Prix series skated last. The skating order for the long program (or free dance, for ice dancers) was the reverse order of their placement in the short program or original dance, unlike ordinary competitions where start orders are determined by a random draw. Ice dancers did not perform a compulsory dance.

The prize money for the 2006 Final was $25,000 for first place in all disciplines (pairs and dance teams split the money); $18,000 for second place; 12,000 for third place; $6,000 for fourth place; $4,000 for fifth place; and $3,000 for sixth place.

Results

Men

Ladies

Pairs

Ice dancing

External links

 

Grand Prix of Figure Skating Final
Grand Prix of Figure Skating Final
Grand Prix of Figure Skating Final
December 2006 sports events in Europe
Grand Prix of Figure Skating Final
International figure skating competitions hosted by Russia
Sports competitions in Saint Petersburg